Jelena Janković was the defending champion, but decided to compete in Stanford at the same week.

First-seeded Anna Smashnova won the title by defeating Catalina Castaño 6–2, 6–2 in the final.

Seeds

Draw

Finals

Top half

Bottom half

References
 Official results archive (ITF)
 Official results archive (WTA)

Tippmix Budapest Grand Prix - Singles
Budapest Grand Prix